A penny-farthing is an early type of bicycle

Penny-farthing can also refer to:
Penny Farthing Records
Penny-Farthing  Press

See also
 Penny (disambiguation)
 Farthing (disambiguation)